Karen Alicia Higuera Contreras (born in La Paz, Baja California Sur on April 2, 1991) is a Mexican beauty pageant titleholder who obtained the 2011 Nuestra Belleza Internacional México title.

From La Paz, Baja California Sur and student of Psychology, Karen Higuera won Nuestra Belleza Baja California Sur 2010 pageant and she won the right to represent her state in 2010 Nuestra Belleza México contest, held September 25, 2010 in Saltillo, Coahuila. The nineteen-year-old was designated as Nuestra Belleza Internacional México 2011 by Lupita Jones on February 15, 2011. She is the first delegate from her state to obtain a national title from the Nuestra Belleza México organization. Higuera competed in the 51st Miss International pageant, held November 6, 2011 in Chengdu, China where she won the title of Miss Friendship.

References

http://www2.esmas.com/entretenimiento/farandula/262114/karen-higuera-nuestra-belleza-internacional-2011

1991 births
Miss International 2011 delegates
Nuestra Belleza México winners
People from La Paz, Baja California Sur
Living people